Horton River may refer to:

In Australia
Horton River (New South Wales), in northern New South Wales
Horton River (Tasmania), in northwestern Tasmania

In Canada
Horton River (Canada), a tributary of the Beaufort Sea

See also 
 Horton (disambiguation)